Toguen is a village in northern Togo.

References

External links 
 indexmundi map of Toguen, Togo.

Populated places in Kara Region